Don't Slander Me is a solo album by 13th Floor Elevators singer Roky Erickson recorded in 1982 and released in 1986. It features former Jefferson Airplane bassist Jack Casady as part of Erickson's backing band.

The recording of the album took two months—from 14 May till 16 July 1982. The song "Burn the Flames," recorded on the last day, was featured on the soundtrack for the 1985 horror movie The Return of the Living Dead.

Reception
Austin Chronicle writer Scott Schinder called Erickson's 1980s albums, released after his half-decade involuntary stay in a Texas psychiatric hospital, "the clearest glimpse into his raging musical soul." He described Don't Slander Me as more ragged and less focused than Erickson's previous album, 1981's The Evil One, but a grabber nonetheless, anchored by such classics as 'Bermuda' and the title track, and revealing a romantic edge in the Buddy Holly pastiches 'Starry Eyes' and 'Nothin' in Return.'" Pitchfork reviewer Jason Heller said that Don’t Slander Me'''s "cleanliness and control ... makes for a more palatable but less vital Erickson" than on the 1981 disc The Evil One, but that its mix of "souped-up garage rock" and "ringing, jangly " power-pop were still powerful, calling the song "Burn the Flames" "good, clean, Halloweenish fun." Billboard writer Morgan Enos called Don't Slander Me Erickson's "attempt to embrace the punk era," and praised the love song "Starry Eyes" as "a heartfelt jangler worthy of the Byrds. It proved Erickson’s music stretched far beyond horror-show tomfoolery: like his hero Buddy Holly, he was a consummate melodic master, and he could write ballads with the best of them." Mark Deming of AllMusic called the album "one of Erickson's strongest rock albums, with his voice sharp as a switchblade. ... While Erickson was at the height of his legendary eccentricity when Don't Slander Me'' was recorded, this album sounds passionate, focused, and coherent on all tracks."

Track listing

References

1986 albums
Roky Erickson albums